Kathleen Kelly was a British stage and film actress of the 1930s.

Filmography
 Once Bitten (1932)
 Designing Women (1934)
 Dangerous Ground (1934)
 What Happened to Harkness? (1934)
 Oh, What a Night (1935)
 The Deputy Drummer (1935)
 Lend Me Your Wife (1935)
 Foreign Affaires (1935)
 Mother, Don't Rush Me (1936)
 Strange Cargo (1936)
 The Avenging Hand (1936)
 The Scarab Murder Case (1936)
 Heart's Desire (1936)
 The Dominant Sex (1937)
 The Mutiny of the Elsinore (1937)
 Who Killed John Savage? (1937)
 The Live Wire (1937)
 Little Miss Somebody (1937)
 Bad Boy (1938)
 The Mysterious Mr. Davis (1939)

References

Bibliography
 Goble, Alan. The Complete Index to Literary Sources in Film. Walter de Gruyter, 1999.

External links

1912 births
Year of death unknown
British film actresses
British stage actresses